This article describes the qualifying of the 2014–15 Women's EHF Champions League.

Format
Eight teams took part in the qualification tournaments. They were drawn into two groups of four teams, where they played a semifinal and a final or third place match. The winners of the qualification tournaments, played on 20–21 September 2014, qualified for the group stage. The draw took place on 26 June 2014, at 14:00 local time, in Vienna, Austria.

Seedings
The seedings were published on 23 June 2014.

Qualification tournament 1
HC Leipzig had the right to organize the tournament.

Bracket

Semifinals

Third place game

Final

HC Leipzig won 5–4 on penalties.

Qualification tournament 2
RK Radnički Kragujevac had the right to organize the tournament.

Bracket

Semifinals

Third place game

Final

References

External links
Official website

2014–15 Women's EHF Champions League